Ermeni Suleyman Pasha also Koca was an Ottoman statesman of Armenian ethnicity. He was Grand Vizier of the Ottoman Empire from 19 August 1655 until 28 February 1656.

He attended Enderun school. Served as governor of Sivas then of Erzurum. Married to the daughter of Sultan Ibrahim I, Ayşe Sultan. After being demoted from the position of Grand Vizier, he was appointed as the governor of Bosnia then as kaymakam of Istanbul, Özü, then Istanbul, and Erzurum again. After this last position, he retired and died in Istanbul

References 

17th-century Grand Viziers of the Ottoman Empire
Armenians from the Ottoman Empire
1607 births
1687 deaths